Holiday(s) in the Sun may refer to:

 Holidays in the Sun (album), by Yui
 Holidays in the Sun (EP), by Cornelius
 Holiday in the Sun (film), starring Mary-Kate and Ashley Olsen
 "Holidays in the Sun" (song), by the Sex Pistols
 "Holiday in the Sun", a song by Pennywise from From the Ashes